Benjamin Brewster is an American retired soccer forward who earned one caps, scoring a single goal, as a member of the U.S. national team in 1973.  He played three seasons in the North American Soccer League and at least two in the American Soccer League.

Player

Youth and college
Brewster did not begin playing soccer until he was eighteen years old.  He attended Brown University and played for the school's soccer team where he was a 1968 second team All-American.  In his four seasons at Brown, Brewster scored thirty-three goals and amassed fifty points.  He has since been inducted into the Brown University Athletic Hall of Fame.

National team
On September 9, 1973 Brewster earned his only caps with the U.S. national team.  Brewster replaced Charlie McCully at halftime and scored the U.S. goal in its 1–0 victory over Bermuda.

Professional
After college, Brewster signed with the Connecticut Wildcats of the American Soccer League (ASL).  In 1974, he joined the Boston Minutemen of the North American Soccer League (NASL).  He left the team after the 1975 season to play for the Tacoma Tides in the ASL.  The Tides folded at the end of the 1976 season and Brewster played for the Rhode Island Oceaneers in 1977.  In 1978, he signed with the New England Tea Men.

Coach
In 1972, Brewster was hired to replace Gyorgy Lang as head coach of Boston College.  He took the team to a 3–9–2 record, but left that position when he signed with the Wildcats in 1973.  In 1977, Boston College hired Brewster again and he remained as head coach for the Eagles until 1987 when he was replaced by Ed Kelly.  His best season came in 1980 when he took his team to a 15–3–3 record.  He finished with a 108–81–29 record.  He also served as an assistant to Hubert Vogelslinger at Yale University and Joe Morrone at the University of Connecticut.  Brewster has also coached in the high school and youth soccer ranks. He currently has his own soccer school in Wolfboro, NH and does travel teams known as "Wildcat Soccer School".

References

External links
 Tides player profile
 Personal profile
 NASL stats

1948 births
Living people
Sportspeople from Newton, Massachusetts
Soccer players from Massachusetts
American soccer coaches
American soccer players
American Soccer League (1933–1983) players
Boston College Eagles men's soccer coaches
Boston Minutemen players
Brown Bears men's soccer players
Connecticut Wildcats soccer players
New England Tea Men players
North American Soccer League (1968–1984) players
Rhode Island Oceaneers players
Tacoma Tides players
UConn Huskies men's soccer coaches
United States men's international soccer players
Yale Bulldogs men's soccer coaches
Association football forwards